Melanie Behringer (born 18 November 1985) is a German footballer who played as a midfielder for Bayern Munich. She was a Best FIFA Women's Player finalist.

Club career
Behringer started her career at SpVgg Utzenfeld and FC Hausen. In 2003, she joined SC Freiburg. She made her Bundesliga debut for Freiburg and played at the club for five seasons. For the 2008–09 season, Behringer transferred to FC Bayern Munich and finished second in the Bundesliga table in her first year in Munich. After two seasons, Behringer joined league rivals 1. FFC Frankfurt in 2010. She won the 2011 German Cup with Frankfurt, defeating 1. FFC Turbine Potsdam in the final. On 31 March 2016, Behringer extended her contract until 2019.

International career
In 2004, Behringer was runner-up with Germany at the 2004 UEFA Women's U-19 Championship and later that year won the 2004 FIFA U-19 Women's World Championship. She scored in all three knockout round games of that tournament, including the final. She made her debut for the German senior national team in January 2005 against China.

She was part of Germany's World Cup winning squad at the 2007 FIFA Women's World Cup, starting in all six games. One year later, she won the bronze medal at the 2008 Summer Olympics and claimed the title at the 2009 European Championship. She scored a long-range goal in the final, for which she won Germany's Goal of the Month award. Behringer has been called up for Germany's 2011 FIFA Women's World Cup squad.

She was part of the squad for the 2016 Summer Olympics, where Germany won the gold medal.

She retired from international football on 23 August 2016.

Career statistics
Scores and results list Germany's goal tally first, score column indicates score after each Behringer goal.

Honours
1. FFC Frankfurt
German Cup: 2010–11, 2013–14

Bayern München
Bundesliga: 2014–15, 2015–16

Germany
FIFA World Cup: 2007
UEFA European Championship: 2009, 2013
Summer Olympic Games: Bronze medal 2008, Gold medal 2016

Germany U20
FIFA U-19 Women's World Championship: 2004

Germany U19
UEFA Women's U-19 Championship: runner-up 2004
Algarve Cup: 2006, 2012, 2014

Individual
Football at the 2016 Summer Olympics: top scorer with five goals
Silbernes Lorbeerblatt: 2007, 2016

References

External links
 
 Profile at DFB 
 Player German domestic football stats at DFB 
 
 
 
 

1985 births
Living people
People from Lörrach
Sportspeople from Freiburg (region)
German women's footballers
Germany women's international footballers
Footballers at the 2008 Summer Olympics
Footballers at the 2016 Summer Olympics
2007 FIFA Women's World Cup players
2011 FIFA Women's World Cup players
2015 FIFA Women's World Cup players
Olympic footballers of Germany
Olympic gold medalists for Germany
Olympic bronze medalists for Germany
SC Freiburg (women) players
FC Bayern Munich (women) players
1. FFC Frankfurt players
Olympic medalists in football
Medalists at the 2008 Summer Olympics
Medalists at the 2016 Summer Olympics
FIFA Women's World Cup-winning players
Women's association football midfielders
FIFA Century Club
Frauen-Bundesliga players
UEFA Women's Championship-winning players
Footballers from Baden-Württemberg